Sandy Bay (also known as ) is a bay which is a part of Pok Fu Lam, located at the south of Mount Davis, Hong Kong Island, Hong Kong.

The developed area at Sandy Bay is home to numerous facilities including Kennedy School, West Island School, the University of Hong Kong Stanley Ho Sports Centre, numerous hospitals and rehabilitation homes such as the Duchess of Kent Children's Hospital. The Chinese Christian Cemetery was established in 1909 and is one of Hong Kong's largest columbaria. There is a track there which schools can book for use. There is a long jump pit, high jump set up, hurdles and other track and field set ups available at the area. It is opposite Kennedy School.

Minibus routes 10, 10P, 58, 58A, 58M, 59, and resident bus HR88 (to Central only after morning) serve the area on Sandy Bay Road and Sha Wan Drive. Citybus route 43M and 47P (peak hours only) and NWFB route 971 stop at Victoria Road.

References 

 
Bays of Hong Kong
Southern District, Hong Kong